Reginald Maurice Ball (12 June 1941 – 4 February 2013), known professionally as Reg Presley, was an English singer and songwriter. He was the lead singer with the 1960s rock and roll band the Troggs, whose hits included "Wild Thing" (#1 on the Hot 100 on 30 July – 6 August 1966) and "With a Girl Like You" (#1 on the UK Official Singles Chart on 4–11 August 1966). He wrote the song "Love Is All Around", which was featured in the films Four Weddings and a Funeral and Love Actually.

Career

Presley, whose stage name was given to him in 1965 by the New Musical Express journalist and publicist Keith Altham, was born in Andover, Hampshire. He joined the building trade on leaving school and became a bricklayer.  He kept at this occupation until "Wild Thing" reached the top 10 on the UK Singles Chart in 1966. It reached No. 2 in the UK, and No. 1 in the US, selling five million copies.

Presley wrote the hits "With a Girl Like You", "I Can't Control Myself" and "Love Is All Around". Wet Wet Wet's 1994 cover of the latter song stayed at No. 1 in the UK Singles Chart for fifteen weeks. Presley used his royalties from that cover to fund research on subjects such as alien spacecraft, lost civilisations, alchemy, and crop circles, and outlined his findings in the book Wild Things They Don't Tell Us, published in October 2002.

Health problems and death
In December 2011, Presley was hospitalised in Winchester, Hampshire, with what was suspected to be a stroke. He was also suffering from pneumonia and fluid around the heart. Presley had suffered a major stroke about a year before. His wife said he first began to feel ill while performing in Germany on 3 December 2011 and had got progressively worse. "Doctors think he has had another stroke. He's not very well and I have no idea how long he'll be in hospital," she said. The following month, Presley announced he had been diagnosed with lung cancer and therefore decided to retire from the music industry. Just over a year later, on 4 February 2013, Presley died from this cancer and, according to Altham, "a succession of recent strokes." Presley was cremated at Basingstoke Crematorium, Hampshire.

A blue plaque in his memory was unveiled in Andover High Street on 31 July 2016, marking where The Troggs used to rehearse.

Influence and legacy
Presley's music has influenced Iggy Pop and won praise from Bob Dylan. The rock critic Lester Bangs called the Troggs the "godfathers of punk" and compared Presley to Marcel Proust. Presley appears as a character in Steve Erickson's novel These Dreams of You (2012).

Discography

References

External links
[ Profile at AllMusic.com]

1941 births
2013 deaths
People from Andover, Hampshire
English male singer-songwriters
The Troggs members
Deaths from lung cancer in England
The Corporation (English band) members